Snells Beach is a small coastal town in the north of Auckland Region in the North Island of New Zealand. It is situated on the eastern coast of the Mahurangi Peninsula and its namesake beach faces east across Kawau Bay to Kawau Island. The nearest town is Warkworth,  to the west, which is linked by 8 buses a day and also Mahu City Express twice a day.

History 
Cornish miner James Snell arrived in Kawau in 1854 and bought land, known as Long Beach. Dalmatian immigrants lived in tents on the beach and dug for kauri gum at low tide. Māori called the neighbouring Algies Bay 'horahora wai', meaning encroaching waters. Scottish immigrant Alexander Algie and wife Mina, née Deerness, bought the land near Martins Bay, where his brother Samuel settled in 1867. The family ran a boarding house on the beach during the late 1890s, which closed in 1941. A metal road was built along the eastern peninsula in the 1930s.

In 2012, the Snells Beach library was marked for closure, leaving many residents bewildered and angry. In 2013, water from Snells Beach was needed for Warkworth's water supply.

Demographics

Snells Beach had a population of 3,405 at the 2018 New Zealand census, an increase of 474 people (16.2%) since the 2013 census, and an increase of 678 people (24.9%) since the 2006 census. There were 1,380 households, comprising 1,656 males and 1,746 females, giving a sex ratio of 0.95 males per female. The median age was 47.9 years (compared with 37.4 years nationally), with 606 people (17.8%) aged under 15 years, 438 (12.9%) aged 15 to 29, 1,374 (40.4%) aged 30 to 64, and 984 (28.9%) aged 65 or older.

Ethnicities were 90.7% European/Pākehā, 10.7% Māori, 5.0% Pacific peoples, 3.3% Asian, and 1.9% other ethnicities. People may identify with more than one ethnicity.

The percentage of people born overseas was 25.4, compared with 27.1% nationally.

Although some people chose not to answer the census's question about religious affiliation, 51.5% had no religion, 38.1% were Christian, 0.4% had Māori religious beliefs, 0.4% were Hindu, 0.2% were Muslim, 0.7% were Buddhist and 1.5% had other religions.

Of those at least 15 years old, 489 (17.5%) people had a bachelor's or higher degree, and 537 (19.2%) people had no formal qualifications. The median income was $28,500, compared with $31,800 nationally. 399 people (14.3%) earned over $70,000 compared to 17.2% nationally. The employment status of those at least 15 was that 1,137 (40.6%) people were employed full-time, 444 (15.9%) were part-time, and 72 (2.6%) were unemployed.

Features and attractions 
 
The 2.5 kilometre long tidal sandy beach, which attracts a variety of shorebirds, is popular for kite surfing, paddle boarding, swimming, fishing, and dog walking. The pohutukawa-lined esplanade reserve features footpaths, playgrounds, picnic areas, a public barbecue, a waterfront café, public toilets, showers, boat ramps, and free overnight parking for motorhomes.

The Mahurangi Shopping Centre includes cafés, retail stores, The Warehouse, public toilets, Wifi facilities, and overnight parking for motorhomes. The adjacent Goodalls Reserve hosts a community centre, library, bowling club, tennis club, kindergarten, skate park, sports fields, dog exercise area, and walking tracks. Nearby is a petrol station, two motels, and several bed and breakfasts.

The Brick Bay Sculpture Trail – an outdoor gallery showcasing contemporary sculpture amongst native trees, palms, birdlife and green pastures – is located at the western entrance of Snells Beach.  Snells Beach contains the Rodney District’s regional television broadcaster: Family TV.

Education
Snells Beach Primary is a coeducational contributing primary school catering for years 1-6. It opened in 2009. The school is intended to grow to about 500 students. Horizon School, formerly Mahurangi Christian School, is a coeducational full primary (years 1-8) school with a roll of  students as at .. The school is state integrated.

References

External links 

 New Zealand Tourism Guide
Snells Beach Official Website

Rodney Local Board Area
Populated places in the Auckland Region
Beaches of the Auckland Region
Matakana Coast